Glykeria (born Glykeria Kotsoula, ; born 16 November 1953 in Agio Pnevma, Serres) is a Greek singer active in Greece and Cyprus, while also gaining fame in Israel, France, Turkey, Spain, and England. Her career has spanned over 30 years and is marked by several multi-platinum releases. On 14 March 2010, Alpha TV ranked Glykeria the third top-certified female artist in the nation's phonographic era (since 1960).

Biography

Early Solo Career 
Glykeria began her career in 1974 working in the Athens Plaka music boites and gave performances with well-known artists, singing songs by M. Hadjidakis, M. Theodorakis, M. Loizos and others.

She began her discographical career by signing with Lyra Music, releasing her first album alongside another rising artist Giorgos Gerolymatos called "Min Kaneis Oneira" (Don't Dream) in 1978. This release caused a stir in the industry, showcasing Glykeria's unique voice to the nation.

1980-1985: Rise To Fame
At the beginning of the 1980s, Glykeria released her first solo album, "Ta Smyrneika", a compilation album with traditional songs from Smyrna. During the following years, Glykeria performed at well-known clubs and bouzoukia, gaining momentum and many fans, and collaborating with other well-known singers, including George Dalaras.
The same year she released her debut album "Sta Matia Koita Me", which was composed entirely by Stelios Fotiadis and marked the beginning of their successful continuing collaboration.

In 1982, she was selected to represent Greece in the Europalia '82 festival in Brussels, together with Sotiria Bellou, George Dalaras and Margarita Zorbala. The following year, Glykeria released her first official live concert "Omorfi Nyhta" and due to its massive success Lyra released her first live album, "me ti Glykeria Stin Omorfi Nyhta", which went on to break every musical sales record in Greece up to that point.

In April 1985, the release of the double-disk album "Tragoudi Aisthimatiko" brought to life some of Glykeria's biggest hits, like "Magisses", "Pentohiliara", "Ta Dahtilidia" and "Fantaraki", pointing the new artist to first place in the album sales of 1985 amongst national and international sales.

In 1986, she sang “Earini Symfonia” (poem by Yiannis Ritsos, music by Yiannis Markopoulos) for the song’s premier performance, at the opening ceremony of the World Championships held for the first time at the Athens Olympic Stadium, broadcast to 120 countries all over the world.

International career 

She has sung in concerts in Greece and abroad (Europe, USA, Canada, Australia, New Zealand, Cyprus, Israel  and Turkey). Due to the successful concerts she gave in Israel she was proclaimed most popular foreign singer; the Mayor of Jerusalem awarded her the golden key of the city (1994). Three albums were released in Israel at the same time, all of them gold in a very short time: Glykeria golden-hits, Far away, Glykeria – 14 classics, and her first album in France: Golden hits – The voice of Greece.

In 1998, her second album was released in France. She took part in two albums for the American label Putumayo and in compilations released in Europe.

In 1999, she performed two concerts in Tel Aviv with the Israel Philharmonic Orchestra. A few months later the concert’s album was released and, immediately afterwards, Glykeria and the Israel Philharmonic Orchestra was released throughout the world by Sony Classical.

In 2001, she participated in the album Alif of the world-renowned musician Omar Faruk Tekbilek.

In 2002, she gave concerts with the “Mikis Theodorakis Orchestra”, the “Estudiantina” orchestra, and gave a personal tour all over Greece as well.

In the same year, her album “Open Heart” was released in Israel and “Glykeria’s Rebetika Songs” in Turkey. In the First Arion Awards in Greece she was awarded the prize for best Greek popular singer. Glykeria, "The Sweet one" in Greek, has been a successful female singer in Greece for many years. In the summer of 1993 she performed in Israel for the first time. She ended her performance with her own captivating version of an Israeli folk song "Shabechi Yerushaly'im" ("Praise the Lord, Jerusalem!") in Hebrew.

Glykeria became the most loved Greek singer in Israel and a major part of Israel's cultural scene in the 1990s. Her special style full of depth, melancholy and endless emotion captured the heart of the Israelis, and her songs, both in Hebrew (with near perfect pronunciation) and Greek became all-time classics. She became a "household" name in Israel, an "honorary citizen", a platinum and gold albums seller, and the favorite of Israel's top leaders and celebrities. Her deep connection to Israel culminated in 1998 when she was the only foreign artist to be invited to sing in the special memorial event for Yitzhak Rabin, the beloved leader who was assassinated three years earlier. With tears in her eyes she sang in front of 200,000 people in Rabin Square in Tel Aviv. In the summer of 1999 she was invited to perform with the Israeli Philharmonic Orchestra. Also in 2006 during the Israel–Lebanon conflict she came to Israel with her son and met Ehud Olmert and sang for the soldiers at the borders.

Glykeria collaborated with world renowned composer Mikis Theodorakis on a two-disc album composed of songs written by the famed composer in 2008.

Collaborations in concerts and discography with: A. Kaldaras, S. Fotiadis, Natacha Atlas, Ömer Faruk Tekbilek, Loukianos Kilaidonis, Mary Linda, Pantelis Thalassinos Sotiria Bellou, George Dalaras, Marinella, Ofra Haza, Ricky Gal, Chava Alberstein,  Amal Murkus, Babis Tsertos, Paschalis Terzis, Ilias Aslanoglou, Antonis Vardis, Sarit Hadad, Fortuna, Nikos Papazoglou and more.

Discography 

 1978: Min Kaneis Oneira Trela
 1980: Sta Matia Kita Me
 1981: Ta Smyrneika
 1983: Apo ti Smyrni ston Peiraia
 1984: Stin Omorfi Nyhta (Live)
 1985: Tragoudi Esthimatiko
 1986: Matia Mou
 1987: Me Panselino
 1988: Nea Selini
 1990: Ola Mou Ta Mystika
 1991: Ximerose
 1992: I Hora Ton Thavmaton
 1992: Nyhtes Magikes ki Oneiremenes (Live)
 1994: Se Mia Schedia
 1996: I Glykeria Tragoudai Antoni Vardi
 1998: Maska
 2000: Harama 2000 (Live)
 2002: Ta Rebetika 2004: Aniksi 2006: Vrohi Ton Asterion 2008: Ta Themelia Mou Sta Vouna 2010: I Agapi Einai Eleftheri 2014: kane kouragio ellada mou''

References

External links
 Glykeria
 Glykeria on Europopmusic.eu (English)
 http://www.myglykeria.gr
 https://web.archive.org/web/20110531161510/http://www.glykeria.com.ar/  (Spanish)

1953 births
Living people
Greek entehno singers
20th-century Greek women singers
Greek laïko singers
Greek folk singers
MAD Video Music Awards winners
Greek Macedonians
People from Emmanouil Pappas